The 1973 Ballon d'Or, given to the best football player in Europe as judged by a panel of sports journalists from UEFA member countries, was awarded to Dutch midfielder Johan Cruyff, for the second time.

Rankings

Source: France Football

External links
 France Football Official Ballon d'Or page

1973
1973–74 in European football